Verkhnebezymyansky is a rural locality (a khutor) and the administrative center of Verkhnebezymyanovskoye Rural Settlement, Uryupinsky District, Volgograd Oblast, Russia. The population was 569 as of 2010. There are 14 streets.

Geography 
Verkhnebezymyansky is located in forest steppe, 37 km southwest of Uryupinsk (the district's administrative centre) by road. Verkhneantoshinsky is the nearest rural locality.

References 

Rural localities in Uryupinsky District